Surkh Jora (lit: Red Dress) is a Pakistani romantic television serial first aired on 28 August 2015 on Hum Sitaray. Serial is produced by Fayyaz Idrees. Sonya Hussain and Azfar Rehman played the lead roles.

Plot
It explores the story of love, devotion and deceit. The series highlights the life of Abiha (Sonya Hussain), a traditional girl with dreams of a good and simple life. People around her admires her, including Roman (Azfar Rehman) who meets her accidentally, and soon they get married with everyone's consent. But soon, Abiha discovers Roman is nothing like what she had found him earlier. Behind his impressive personality lurks a male chauvinist who hates girls with progressive ideas. Series then shows Abiha's struggle to be able to change Roman.

Cast
Sonya Hussain as Zimmal / Abiha 
Azfar Rehman as Roman 
Laila Zuberi as Zakia 
Naila Jaffri as Sadia 
Irfan Khoosat Sarmad
Tipu Sharif as Eshan
Sabahat Ali Bukhari as Sobia
Nadia Afgan as Sabiha 
Irfan Khoosat
Hammad Farooqui
Isra Ghazal 
Munnazah arif as Safia

References

External links
 Surkh Jorra on Official Website

Hum Network Limited
Urdu-language television shows
Pakistani drama television series
2015 Pakistani television series debuts
2015 Pakistani television series endings
Hum Sitaray